The City of Seattle Landmarks Preservation Board, part of the Department of Neighborhoods of the city of Seattle, Washington, United States, designates city landmarks. According to the department's official website, the following are designated landmarks; the list should be complete .

All designated landmarks are added to chapter 25.32 of the Seattle municipal code and are approved via legislative action from the Seattle City Council.

See also list of designated Historic Districts.

Seattle landmarks

Sources for list:

See also
 National Register of Historic Places listings in Seattle

References

Lists of landmarks
Locally designated landmarks in the United States
Washington (state) geography-related lists
Landmarks